Dale Baldillo (born October 6, 2000) is a Filipino actor who is known for his roles in Annaliza  and Budoy.

Career

Baldillo was born on October 6, 2000, and raised in Manila, Philippines. He began modelling at age 10 for apparel brands before appearing on Philippine television. He first appeared in various commercials in 2009 at age 7. He then auditioned for several television series. He first starred in the fantasy drama Wansapanataym in the episode "Gising Na Omar".

In 2011, Baldillo was cast in the prime time drama television series, Budoy, as the young Budoy.

His first notable acting role was in a supporting role in the remake of Annaliza in 2013, playing the best friend of the lead character Annaliza. He also appeared in the pilot episodes of ABS-CBN's prime time television series  Bukas Na lang Kitang Mamahalin.

Filmography

Television

Film

References

2000 births
Living people
21st-century Filipino male actors
ABS-CBN personalities
Filipino male child actors
Male actors from Manila
Star Magic